In applied mathematics, the construction of an irreducible Markov Chain in the Ising model is the first step in overcoming a computational obstruction encountered when a Markov chain Monte Carlo method is used to get an exact goodness-of-fit test for the finite Ising model.

The Ising model was used to study magnetic phase transitions at the very beginning, and now it is one of the most famous models of interacting systems.

Markov bases 
A Markov basis for the Ising model is a set  of integer vectors such that:

(ii) For any  and any , there always exist  satisfy

 

and

 

for l = 1,...,k.

Then using the Metropolis–Hastings algorithm, we can get an aperiodic, reversible and irreducible Markov Chain.

The paper published by P.DIACONIS AND B.STURMFELS in 1998 ‘Algebraic algorithms for sampling from conditional distributions’ shows that a Markov basis can be defined algebraically as in Ising model

Then by the paper published by P.DIACONIS AND B.STURMFELS in 1998, any generating set for the ideal  is a Markov basis for the Ising model.

Construction of an irreducible Markov chain 
Thus in the following we will show how to modify the algorithm mentioned in the paper to get the irreducible Markov chain in Ising model.

Z denotes the set of sample swaps.

 

with

 

for l = 1,...,k

The algorithm can be describe as:

(i) Start with the Markov chain in a configuration 

(ii) Select  uniformly at random and let.

(iii) Accept  if ; otherwise remain in y.

Although the resulting Markov Chain is possible cannot leave initial states, the problem does not arise for the 1 dimensional Ising model which we will introduce in the following. In high dimension we can overcome this problem by using Metropolis-Hastings algorithm in the smallest expanded sample space

Irreducibility in the 1-dimensional Ising model 
Before prove of the irreducibility in 1-dimensional Ising model, we present two lemma below:

There exists a sequence  such that:

 

and

 

for l = 1,...,k

Since  is the smallest expanded sample space, which contains . And any two configurations in  can be connected by simple swaps Z without
leaving . This can be prove by the lemma we present above. So we an get the irreducibility of the Markov Chain based on simple swaps for the 1-dimension Ising model.

Conclusion 
Even though we just show the irreducibility of the Markov chain based on simple swaps for the 1-dimension Ising model, we can get the same conclusion of 2-dimension or higher dimension Ising model.

References 

Lattice models
Markov chain Monte Carlo